Laksha Warina, Lakshawarina, Llaksha Warina or Llakshawarina (Quechua, Hispanicized Lacshahuarina, Lacsha Huarina, Llacshahuarina, Llacsha Huarina), also known as Corona del Inca (Spanish for "crown of the Inca"), is a mountain in Peru. The mountain is situated in the Huánuco Region, Yarowilca Province, on the border of the districts Chavinillo, Choras and Jacas Chico.

See also 
 T'akaq
 Waruq

References 

Mountains of Peru
Mountains of Huánuco Region